Events in the year 1996 in Eritrea.

Incumbents 

 President: Isaias Afewerki

Events 

 28 October – The Eritrean Investment and Development Bank (EIDB) was established.
 The Eritrean Telecommunication Services Corporation was founded.

Deaths

References 

 
1990s in Eritrea
Years of the 20th century in Eritrea
Eritrea
Eritrea